Elachista kalki is a moth of the family Elachistidae. It is found in Austria, Germany, Greece, Hungary, Italy, Kazakhstan and Russia (southern Urals, Volga region, Tuva Republic).

The length of the forewings is 4.8–5.5 mm for males and 4.8–5.2 mm for females. The forewings are broad, unicolorous shiny white except the basal part of the costa which is narrowly dark grey. The hindwings are pale grey and translucent with a white fringe.

References

kalki
Moths described in 1978
Moths of Europe
Moths of Asia